Street Sounds Electro 4 is the fourth compilation album in a series released in 1984 on the StreetSounds label. The album was released on LP and cassette and contains seven electro music and old school hip hop tracks mixed by DJ's Maurice and Noel Watson/Bunny Rock.

Track listing

References

External links
 Street Sounds Electro 4 at Discogs

1984 compilation albums
Hip hop compilation albums
Electro compilation albums